Nino Martoglio (Belpasso, Paternò, 3 December 1870 — Catania, 15 September 1921) was an Italian writer, publisher, journalist and producer of theatrical works.  He wrote mostly in Sicilian and likewise, his theatrical works were mostly in Sicilian.  He founded a theatre company in Catania in the early part of the 20th century.  In the latter stages of his life he had some success as a film director.

From  1889 to 1904 he published a weekly magazine called D'Artagnan.   It represents one of the very few periodicals ever to have been published in Sicilian to enjoy prolonged success.  Its content included art, literature, theatre and politics, or more accurately, political satire.

In terms of the Sicilian language, Martoglio is an important figure in the establishment of Sicilian as an acceptable literary language.

His magazine also played a role in discovering such leading Italian illustrators as Giovanni Grasso and Angelo Musco.  His theatre company debuted the works of renowned dramatists such as Pier Maria Rosso di San Secondo and the Nobel prize winner, Luigi Pirandello. He founded the Compagnia drammatica siciliana in 1903.

From 1913 to 1915 he started directing movies. He enjoyed some success with Teresa Raquin and Sperduti nel buio. In 1919 he founded the Compagnia Drammatica del Teatro Mediterraneo. Martoglio’s films are among a small core of films that constitute the realismo movement, which later inspired neorealism. In the 1930s, film critic and teacher Umberto Barbaro exalted Sperduti nel buio in his essays, and showed it in his classes at Centro Sperimentale di Cinematografia in Rome. These classes were attended by Roberto Rossellini and Luchino Visconti, who would become instrumental in defining the neorealism film movement after the Second World War.

His best known theatrical works, which enjoyed success throughout Italy, include Nica (from  1903), L’aria del Continente (from 1915), and San Giuvanni Decollato from 1908.

His most important literary work is Centona, a collection of poetry published in 1899.

Example 

Martoglio is best remembered for crafting poems out of the everyday conversations of common people, as can be seen in this extract from the poem Briscula 'n Cumpagni 
, which translates loosely as: a game of cards amongst friends (from around 1900):

References 

 The Dialect Poetry of Nino Martoglio: Sociolinguistic Issues in a Literary Context, by Antonio Scuderi, (1992) Peter Lang.
 “Code Interaction in Nino Martoglio’s I Civitoti in Pretura,” by Antonio Scuderi, in Italica (69.I) (1992), 61-71.
 “Sicilian Dialect Theatre,” by Antonio Scuderi, in A History of Italian Theatre, (2006) Cambridge University Press, 257-65.

External links
 
 
 (Cummattimentu di Orlandu e Rinardu, from Centona, in Sicilian)
 The complete online version of Centona, in Sicilian
 

Sicilian-language writers
People from the Province of Catania
1870 births
1921 deaths
Italian male dramatists and playwrights
Italian male poets
19th-century Italian poets
19th-century Italian dramatists and playwrights
19th-century journalists
20th-century Italian poets
20th-century Italian dramatists and playwrights
Italian journalists
Italian male journalists
Italian film directors
19th-century Italian male writers
20th-century Italian male writers